Fernanda de Goeij (born November 11, 2000 in Curitiba) is a Brazilian swimmer.

International career

She started swimming in the butterfly style, but a back problem prevented her from following the training in style, changing to the swim that gave her national titles and the vacancies in the Brazilian National Team.

At the 2018 South American Games in Cochabamba, she won a gold medal in the 4 × 100 m medley, and two silver medals in the 100m and 200m backstroke.

At the 2018 Summer Youth Olympics held in Buenos Aires, she won a silver medal in the Girls' 4 × 100 metre freestyle relay. It was the first time that a Brazil's women's relay won a swimming medal on a world level. She also finished 4th in the Girls' 4 × 100 metre medley relay, 5th in the Girls' 50 metre backstroke, 9th in the Girls' 100 metre backstroke, 11th in the Girls' 200 metre backstroke and 12th in the Mixed 4 × 100 metre medley relay.

With just 18 years old, she went to the 2019 Pan American Games held in Lima, Peru, where, in the Women's 200 metre backstroke, she broke the South American record, with a time of 2:11.95, finishing 4th in the race. In the Women's 4 × 100 metre medley relay, she won a bronze medal, by participating at heats. She also finished 5th in the Women's 100 metre backstroke, and 7th in the Women's 400 metre individual medley.

References

Brazilian female backstroke swimmers
Living people
Brazilian female freestyle swimmers
Brazilian female medley swimmers
2000 births
Sportspeople from Curitiba
Swimmers at the 2018 Summer Youth Olympics
Swimmers at the 2019 Pan American Games
Pan American Games medalists in swimming
Pan American Games bronze medalists for Brazil
South American Games medalists in swimming
South American Games gold medalists for Brazil
South American Games silver medalists for Brazil
Medalists at the 2019 Pan American Games
21st-century Brazilian women